The Lawson McGhee Library is the main library of Knox County Public Library in Knoxville, Tennessee. It is located at 500 West Church Avenue in downtown Knoxville.

The library was established in 1885 with a $50,000 donation from Knoxville businessman Charles McClung McGhee, and named for McGhee's daughter, May Lawson McGhee, who had died suddenly in 1883.

The current Lawson McGhee Library building was designed by architect Bruce McCarty.

Gallery

References

External links

Education in Knoxville, Tennessee
Buildings and structures in Knoxville, Tennessee
Public libraries in Tennessee
Brutalist architecture in Tennessee